is a Japanese drummer and actor. He is nicknamed  and N.K. He is a member of the rock band Rize. He is represented with Itoh Company and his label is Illchill. He graduated from Horikoshi High School.

Kaneko's father was Johnny Yoshinaga who was also a drummer, and his mother is singer Mari Kaneko. His younger brother is Kensuke Kaneko (known as KenKen) who is the bassist of Rize, and the brothers formed a rhythm section.

In November 2013, Kaneko married a non-celebrity woman who is a former model.

Discography

Bands
Gonna Be Fun: a band formed in Ponkickies with Rie Tomosaka (vocals) and Takumi Samejima (guitar). On 1 November 1997, the band released a single CD "Birthday Party" with Toshiba EMI.
Rize: three-piece band with Jesse (vocals) and his brother KenKen (bass).
Dadas: Indie band with Daisuke Ide (vocal and guitar), Hidenaki Tanaka (bass), Kenji Akimine (guitar) and Kaneko (drums). They belong to Disillusion Recordings.
Torcerse: a unit formed by Kaneko and KenKen in December 2006. Their main activities are live sessions etc.
AA=: solo project by Takeshi Ueda (The Mad Capsule Markets). He participate in live tours with drum support.
Lands
Red Orca

Solo activities
He started solo activities since 2009.

Albums

Limited singles

Music videos

Tours

Related artists
Rize
Johnny Yoshinaga
Mari Kaneko
Char
Dadas
Def Tech – album recording, 2006 tour support
Kazuya Yoshii – 2005 tour support
Daisuke Ide
Micro – 2008 tour support, composing participation
AA= – 2009 tour support
kayoko – 2004 cording
Chara – 2008 album recording
Buono! – 2009 recording
Aggressive Dogs – 2009 "loud" recording
The SanPaulo – 2009 live guest
Trio Ohashi – 2013 album plugged recording

Equipment used
Drum kits
Orange County Drum and Percussion (2000 to 2003)
Pearl

Filmography

TV dramas

Other TV programmes

Films

DVD

Advertisements

Radio

Magazines

Video games

References

External links
 
 
Tokushū: Ano Hito no totte oki Selection: Nobuaki Kaneko-san NHK Archives 

1981 births
20th-century drummers
20th-century Japanese male actors
20th-century Japanese male musicians
21st-century drummers
21st-century Japanese male actors
21st-century Japanese male musicians
Horikoshi High School alumni
Japanese film score composers
Japanese male child actors
Japanese male film score composers
Japanese rock drummers
Living people
Musicians from Tokyo
Video game composers